Mark A. Cane is an American climate scientist. He obtained his PhD at MIT in 1975. He is currently the G. Unger Vetlesen Professor of Earth and Climate Sciences at Columbia University and the Lamont Doherty Earth Observatory.  He actively pursues several research and teaching initiatives, and supports the Columbia climate kids corner . As of November 11, 2015, his publications have been cited over 22,600 times, and he has an h-index of 75.

He was involved in the first numerical prediction of El Niño-Southern Oscillation in 1986.

Education 
Mark Cane was the Valedictorian of the June 1961 graduation class of Midwood High School. He went on to study in Boston, receiving a A.B. in Applied Mathematics in 1965. He went on to do graduate work at Massachusetts Institute of Technology, receiving his Ph.D. in Meteorology in just three years under the guidance of thesis advisor Jule Charney. He continued post-doctoral work at M.I.T., becoming a member of the group of ground-breaking earth scientists who referred to themselves as "the 14th floor".

Selected publications

Selected awards
 2017 Vetlesen Prize
 2015 The Oceanography Society Member
 2013 National Academy of Sciences Member
 2013 Maurice Ewing Medal of the American Geophysical Union 
 2009 Norbert Gerbier-MUMM International Award from the World Meteorological Organization
 2007 California Department of Water Resources – Climate Science paper award
 2004–2007 Earth and Planetary Science Letters Most Cited Paper 
 2003 Bronze Award for Magazines Feature Article, 25,001 to 100,000 to “American Scientist “Ethnoclimatology in the Andes”  
 2003 Cody Award in Ocean Sciences from Scripps Institution of Oceanography
 2002 American Academy of Arts and Sciences Fellow
 1995 American Association for the Advancement of Science Fellow
 1995 American Geophysical Union Fellow
 1993 Fellow, American Meteorological Society
 1992 Sverdrup Medal of the American Meteorological Society
 1984–1986 National Science Foundation Creativity Award

References

External links 
 Text about Cane at the Earth Institute of Columbia University
 Mark Cane, George Philander, Win 2017 Vetlesen Prize http://climateandlife.columbia.edu/2017/01/26/mark-cane-george-philander-win-2017-vetlesen-prize/

Living people
Year of birth missing (living people)
American climatologists
Massachusetts Institute of Technology School of Science alumni
Columbia University faculty
Columbia School of Engineering and Applied Science faculty
Midwood High School alumni
Sverdrup Gold Medal Award Recipients
Scientists from New York (state)
Members of the United States National Academy of Sciences
Fellows of the American Meteorological Society